Margaret Cross Primrose Findlay (1902–1968) was a Scottish sculptor and modeller.

Biography

Findlay was born at Glenlivet in Banffshire and trained at the Glasgow School of Art under Archibald Dawson between 1920 and 1925. After graduation she taught at the Beacon School at Bridge of Allan and then at Hillhead High School in Glasgow.

Findlay was the modeller for the Mercat cross in Glasgow, carving the wooden animals. The Mercat Cross is considered a significant artistic triumph for Scottish women, as Findlay worked on it with Edith Burnet Hughes, the first practising female architect in Scotland.

From the mid 1920s to the mid 1930s, Findlay created several works including "Cobler (1927), The Bathers (1928), Gossip (1928), Head of a Baby (1930), Dancers (1931), King of the Castle (1931), Shy (1934) and Morning Song (1935)". For the 1938 Glasgow Empire Exhibition she created a frieze of figures.

Exhibitions and awards 
Findlay's work was exhibited at the Royal Glasgow Institute of the Fine Arts and the Royal Scottish Academy in Edinburgh. In December 1928, Findlay was awarded the Guthrie Award by the Royal Scottish Academy.

References

External links 
 

1902 births
1968 deaths
Scottish sculptors
Scottish women sculptors
Alumni of the Glasgow School of Art
20th-century British sculptors
20th-century Scottish women artists